The Borei class, alternate transliteration Borey, Russian designation Project 955 Borei and Project 955A Borei-A (NATO reporting name Dolgorukiy), are a series of nuclear-powered ballistic missile submarines being constructed by Sevmash for the Russian Navy. The class is projected to replace the Soviet-era Delta III, Delta IV and  classes in Russian Navy service.

Despite being a replacement for many types of SSBNs, Borei-class submarines are much smaller than those of the Typhoon class in both volume and crew (24,000 tons opposed to 48,000 tons and 107 personnel as opposed to 160 for the Typhoons). In terms of class, they are more accurately a follow-on for the Delta IV-class SSBNs.

History
The first design work on the project started in the mid-1980s and the construction of the first vessel started in 1996. Previously, a short-lived, smaller parallel design appeared in 1980s with designation Project 935 Borei II. A new submarine-launched ballistic missile (SLBM) called the R-39UTTH Bark was developed in parallel. However, the work on this missile was abandoned and a new missile, the RSM-56 Bulava, was designed. The submarine needed to be redesigned to accommodate the new missile, and the design name was changed to Project 955. The vessels were developed by Rubin Design Bureau are being built by Russia's Northern shipyard Sevmash in Severodvinsk.

It was reported in 2013 that the arrival of the Borei class will enable the Russian Navy to resume strategic patrols in southern latitudes that had not seen a Russian missile submarine for 20 years.

Launch and trials

The launch of the first submarine of the class,  (Юрий Долгорукий), was scheduled for 2002 but was delayed because of budget constraints. The vessel was eventually rolled out of its construction hall on 15 April 2007 in a ceremony attended by many senior military and industrial personnel. Yuriy Dolgorukiy was the first Russian strategic missile submarine to be launched in seventeen years since the end of the Cold War. The planned contingent of eight strategic submarines was expected to be commissioned within the next decade, with five Project 955 planned for purchase through 2015.

Yuriy Dolgorukiy was not put into the water until February 2008. By July 2009, it had yet to be armed with Bulava missiles and was therefore not fully operational, although it was ready for sea trials on 24 October 2008.
On 21 November 2008 the reactor on Yuriy Dolgorukiy was activated and on 19 June 2009, the submarine began its sea trials in the White Sea.

In August 2009 it was reported that the submarine would undergo up to six trials before being commissioned, but the problem with the Bulava missile could delay it even more.

On 28 September 2010 Yuriy Dolgorukiy completed company sea trials. By late October the Russian Pacific Fleet was fully prepared to host Russia's new Borei-class strategic nuclear-powered submarines. It is expected that four subs will be deployed in the Northern Fleet and four subs in the Pacific Fleet. On 9 November 2010 Yuriy Dolgorukiy passed all sea trials directed to new equipment and systems.

Initially, the plan was to conduct the first torpedo launches during the ongoing state trials in December 2010 and then in the same month conduct the first launch of the main weapon system, RSM-56 Bulava SLBM. The plan was then postponed to mid-summer 2011 due to ice conditions in the White Sea.

On 2 December 2010 the second Borei-class submarine, Alexander Nevskiy, was moved to a floating dock in Sevmash shipyard. There the final preparations took place before the submarine was launched. The submarine was launched on 6 December 2010 and began sea trials on 24 October 2011.

On 28 June 2011 a Bulava missile was launched for the first time from the Borei-class submarine Yuriy Dolgorukiy. The test was announced as a success. After long delays finally the lead vessel, Yuriy Dolgorukiy, joined the Russian Navy on 10 January 2013. The official ceremony raising the Russian Navy colors on the submarine was led by Russian Defense Minister Sergey Shoygu. It was actively deployed in 2014 after a series of exercises.

On 17 November 2017, the fourth Borei-class submarine and the first of the improved Project 955A, the Knyaz Vladimir was moved out of the construction hall at the SEVMASH shipyard. The submarine was launched a year later and subsequently started its factory trials.

On 25 October 2022, the first photo of the Generalissimus Suvorov, the sixth vessel in the class, were published while performing sea trials. On 7 November, all trials were finished and she was being prepared for commissioning.

Design

Borei class includes a compact and integrated hydrodynamically efficient hull for reduced broadband noise and the first ever use of pump-jet propulsion on a Russian nuclear submarine. Russian news service TASS claimed the noise level is to be five times lower when compared to the third-generation nuclear-powered Akula-class submarines and two times lower than that of the U.S. Virginia-class submarines. The acoustic signature of Borei is significantly stealthier than that of the previous generations of Russian SSBNs, but it has been reported that their hydraulic pumps become noisier after a relatively short period of operation, reducing the stealth capabilities of the submarine.

They are equipped with a floating rescue chamber designed to fit in the whole crew. Smaller than the Typhoon class, the Boreis were initially reported to carry 12 missiles but are able to carry four more due to the decrease in mass of the 36-ton Bulava SLBM (a modified version of the Topol-M ICBM) over the originally proposed R-39UTTH Bark. Cost was estimated in 2010 at some ₽23 billion (USD$734 million, equivalent to US$863 million in 2020 terms). In comparison the cost of an  SSBN was around US$2 billion per boat (1997 prices, equivalent to over US$3 billion in 2020 terms).

Each Borei is constructed with 1.3 million components and mechanisms. Its construction requires 17 thousand tons of metal which is 50% more than the Eiffel Tower. The total length of piping is 109 km and the length of wiring is 600 km. Ten thousand rubber plates cover the hull of the boat.

Versions

Project 955A (Borei-A)

Units of the Project 955A include improved communication and detection systems, improved acoustic signature and have major structural changes such as addition of all moving rudders and vertical endplates to the hydroplanes for higher maneuverability, and a different sail geometry. Besides, they are equipped with hydraulic jets and improved screws that allow them to sail at nearly 30 knots while submerged with minimal noise. Although first reported to carry 20 Bulava SLBMs, the 955A will be armed with 16 SLBMs with 6-10 nuclear warheads atop each, just like the project 955 submarines.

The contract for five modified 955A submarines was delayed several times due to price dispute between the Russian Defence Ministry and the United Shipbuilding Corporation. The contract was formally signed on 28 May 2012.

The first 955A submarine, Knyaz Vladimir, was laid down on 30 July 2012, during a ceremony attended by the Russian President Vladimir Putin. Two additional project 955A submarines were laid down in 2014, one in late 2015, and one in late 2016.

According to Sevmash official, Vitaliy Bukovskiy, all Borei-A submarines are to be equipped with aspen banyas able to accommodate 3-4 people.

Project 955B (Borei-B)
The Project 955B was expected to feature a new water jet propulsion system, an upgraded hull, and new noise reduction technology. The concept design was to be initiated by the Rubin Design Bureau in 2018 and four project 955B boats were proposed with the first unit to be delivered to the Russian Navy in 2026. However, the project wasn't reportedly included in the Russia's State Armament Programme for 2018–2027 due to cost-efficiency. Instead, six more Borei-A submarines were to be built after 2023. According to a 2018 report, Russia's State Armament Programme for 2018–2027 includes construction of two more Borei-A submarines by 2028. The construction should take place at Sevmash starting in 2024 with deliveries to the Russian Navy in 2026 and 2027 respectively.

Borei-K
A proposed version armed with cruise missiles instead of SLBMs, similar to the American Ohio-class nuclear-powered cruise missile submarines (SSGNs), is under consideration by the Russian Defence Ministry.

Units

See also
 List of Soviet and Russian submarine classes
 Future of the Russian Navy
 List of submarine classes in service
 Submarine-launched ballistic missile
 Khabarovsk-class submarine

References

External links

  Yury Dolgorukiy picture gallery
  Photo of Yury Dolgorukiy on sea trials June 2009
  Yury Dolgorukiy in dry dock, Sevmash, Severodvinsk (satellite photo)
 New pictures of Yury Dolgorukiy
  Announcement that the first boat will be launched in April 2007
  Announcement (in Russian) that first boat would not be ready until 2007.
 Project 935 / Project 955 Borei
 Image gallery:Yury Dolgorukiy, a Borei-class nuclear missile submarine 
 Borei-class missile complement
  Photos of Alexander Nevsky while the sub was launched at Sevmash shipyard

Submarine classes
 
Russian and Soviet navy submarine classes
Nuclear submarines of the Russian Navy